Sanino is a rural locality (a selo) in Seletskoye Rural Settlement, Suzdalsky District, Vladimir Oblast, Russia. The population was 29 as of 2010. There are 2 streets.

Geography 
Sanino is located on the Uyechka River, 19 km southeast of Suzdal (the district's administrative centre) by road. Prudy is the nearest rural locality.

References 

Rural localities in Suzdalsky District
Suzdalsky Uyezd